Brilliant Suleyman gyzy Dadashova (born 15 September 1959 or 1965, according to other sources) is an Azerbaijani pop singer.

Life 
Brilliant Dadashova was born into a family of five children. Her older sisters also pursued careers in music.

She first appeared on stage in 1985 with the songs by Azerbaijani composer Eldar Mansurov. In 1986, she participated in the annual International Youth Festival in Moscow. Two years later, she won the prestigious All-Union Pop Singers Contest, a singing competition among representatives of the republics of the Soviet Union. In 1990, she graduated from the Azerbaijan National Culture and Arts Institute. She is one of the few pop singers native to Azerbaijan to have played outside of their home country. Dadashova's concert venues included the U.S., Canada, the United Kingdom, Germany, Austria, Sweden, Russia, and Turkey.

In 1995, her song Züleyha hit the top 10 in Russian charts. In 1997, Dadashova was among the musicians who participated in the recording of the album Landet vi kommer fra ("The Land We Came From"; released by Kirkelig Kulturverksted in Norway), which included Azerbaijani folk songs sung in Azerbaijani and Norwegian by the Azerbaijani soloists and the Norwegian choir SKRUK. In 1999, Brilliant Dadashova was elected to the Baku City Council. From 2001 to 2006 she hosted her own prime time talk-show Gözəllik dünyanı xilas edəcək ("Beauty will save the world") on Azerbaijan's Space TV.

In 2012, her song Vokaliz (a 2001 vocal improvisation of the Azerbaijani folk dance tunes Meydan and Baki, as well as Vagif Garayzadeh's Novruzu musical composition) became an issue of controversy after allegedly having been performed by the Armenian singer Varduhi Vardanyan, who was accused of violating copyright. Vardanyan vehemently denied the accusations and claimed that the song is a traditional Armenian folk song. Since September 2006, Brilliant Dadashova has been actively involved in the Akademiya TV-project (the Azerbaijani version of Star Academy) aimed at professional musical training of talented youths and preparing them for the big stage. During her career, Brilliant released seven albums. Her last one called Saninlayam ("I'm with You"), was released in September 2002, and was dedicated to the memory of composer Rafig Babayev. She released another studio album, titled Masal Dunyam, in Azerbaijan and Turkey in August 2008. The song 'Per sempre' with Adriano Celentano was published in 2021.

Brilliant Dadashova is married to stage actor Adalat Hajiyev and has a son. In March 2011, she announced that she had filed for divorce due to a long-term complicated relationship. In 2020, Brilliant Dadashova celebrated 32 years of marriage.

References

External links 
 
 Brilliant Dadashova's Homepage at brilliantdadasova.com
  (videoclip shot in 2004)

1959 births
Living people
20th-century Azerbaijani women singers
Musicians from Baku
People's Artists of Azerbaijan
Soviet Azerbaijani people
Turkish-language singers
21st-century Azerbaijani women singers